Victoria International College is private college located in Kuala Lumpur, Malaysia. Its diploma programs are approved and recognized by the MOHE and MQA, and the skill courses are approved by the MOHR and PTPTK department.

Courses
The list of the courses conducted in Victoria International College:
 Certificate in Business Studies
 Certificate in Hotel and Catering Management
 Certificate in Travel Operation
 Diploma in Risk Management
 Diploma in Information and Communication Technology
 Diploma in Games Design
 Diploma in Business Administration
 Diploma in Hotel & Catering Management
 Diploma In Business Information Technology
 Diploma in Culinary Arts
 Diploma in Accountancy
 Diploma in Human Resource Management
 English Language Programme Level 1, 2 and 3
 Bahasa Malaysia Level 1, 2 and 3
 SKM Programmes
 Setiausaha Koprat - Tahap 3, 4 & 5
 Kulinari - Tahap 2, 3, 4 & 5
 Multimedia - Tahap 2, 3, & 4
 Rangkaian Komputer - Tahap 3 & 4

References

External links

Colleges in Malaysia
Universities and colleges in Kuala Lumpur
Educational institutions established in 1976
1976 establishments in Malaysia